Bokar Tulku Rinpoche (1940 – 17 August 2004) was heart-son of the Second Kalu Rinpoche and a holder of the Karma Kagyü and Shangpa Kagyü lineages.

Rinpoche is an honorific used in Tibetan Buddhism. It means "precious one".

References

External links

Rinpoche literally means "Great (che) Jewel (rinpo)". It is figuratively rendered as "Precious One."

1940 births
2004 deaths
20th-century lamas
Karma Kagyu lamas
Shangpa Kagyu lamas
Tibetan Buddhist spiritual teachers
Tulkus